Nazeel Azami is an English singer.

Early life 
Azami is of Bangladeshi descent. He went to a primary school in London, secondary schools in three countries, and graduated with a BSc in Physics with Business and Management, and PGCE from the University of Manchester.

Azami developed his music talent at a very young age after his mother encouraged him to memorise and recite spiritual poetry and songs, old and new. He was further influenced by his maternal uncle who was also a singer-songwriter and poet.

Career 
In September 2006, Azami's debut album Dunya was released by Awakening Records. The album combined different languages, themes and cultures. Previously he had featured as a backing vocalist on Sami Yusuf's first album, Al-Muʽallim. He sings in a number of languages, including English, Bengali, Arabic and Urdu.

In November 2006, he performed at the Global Peace and Unity Event at the ExCeL Exhibition Centre in London.

In 2013, after taking a five-year hiatus, Azami is due to return with a new music video and album under British record label UMA Global. In July 2014, his single "Allahu" was released. In August 2014, he was interviewed by Sunny and Shay Grewal on BBC London 94.9. In July 2014, he performed at Eid in the Square.

Discography

Singles

Albums

See also 

British Bangladeshis
List of British Bangladeshis
Bengali music
Arabic music
Islamic music
Nasheed

References

External links 

1981 births
Living people
Date of birth missing (living people)
English people of Bangladeshi descent
Performers of Islamic music
English male singer-songwriters
Arabic-language singers
Urdu-language singers
Bengali-language singers
Schoolteachers from London
Singers from London
Musicians from Manchester
Alumni of the University of Manchester
Awakening Music artists
21st-century English singers
21st-century British male singers